Sacred Heart Cathedral (Japanese: カトリック山手教会) is the seat of the bishop of the Roman Catholic Diocese of Yokohama, Japan. The Yokohama diocese includes Kanagawa, Shizuoka, Nagano, and Yamanashi prefectures.

Immediately after the lifting of the a long-standing ban on Christianity, a Catholic church was built in 1862 by the Paris Foreign Missions Society in the Yokohama foreign settlement (currently Yamashita-cho). This church was moved to its current location in 1906, and was a brick building with two bell towers, which was completely destroyed during the 1923 Great Kantō earthquake. The present Yamate Catholic Church was designed by Czech architect Jan Josef Švagr in the Neo-Gothic style and completed in 1933.  When the Diocese of Yokohama was erected in 1937, the Yamate church became its cathedral.

Currently, Catholic Masses are held on weekdays at 7am, Saturdays at 6pm, and Sundays at 7.30am, 9.30am (English services) and 1130am.  Spanish language services are held every month on the second Sunday at 2pm (excluding July and August, when no Spanish services are held).

See also
List of cathedrals in Japan

References

External links
History of Diocese of Yokohama
Diocese of Yokohama at Catholic-Hierarchy.org
Sacred Heart Cathedral homepage   
 at ”ミサの時間。”

Naka-ku, Yokohama
Roman Catholic cathedrals in Japan
Buildings and structures in Yokohama
Religious buildings and structures in Kanagawa Prefecture
Tourist attractions in Yokohama
1862 establishments in Japan
19th-century Roman Catholic church buildings in Japan
20th-century Roman Catholic church buildings in Japan